The Rocky Hill Historic District is a  historic district encompassing the historic core of the borough of Rocky Hill in Somerset County, New Jersey. The village is approximately one square mile and traces its beginnings to the 18th century, when George Washington stayed at Rockingham, and its major growth period to the second quarter of the 19th century. Located along Washington Street and Montgomery, Princeton, and Crescent Avenues, the district encompasses 145 buildings, only 12 of which are non-contributing, and has sustained its historic character without the intrusion of modern structures or parking lots.  The most notable landmark in the village is Dutch Reformed Church, built in 1856 in the Carpenter Gothic style. The district was added to the National Register of Historic Places on July 8, 1982, for its significance in archeology, architecture and commerce.

Gallery

See also
National Register of Historic Places listings in Somerset County, New Jersey

References

National Register of Historic Places in Somerset County, New Jersey
New Jersey Register of Historic Places
Historic districts on the National Register of Historic Places in New Jersey
Rocky Hill, New Jersey